Erasma Arellano was a Filipino track and field athlete. As a member of the Philippine men’s track and field team, he was a bronze medalist for the 4 × 400 metres relay in the 1958 Asian Games.

References

Date of birth missing
Date of death missing
Filipino male sprinters
Asian Games medalists in athletics (track and field)
Asian Games bronze medalists for the Philippines
Medalists at the 1958 Asian Games
Athletes (track and field) at the 1958 Asian Games